Richard Lawrence Williams (born 22 Aug 1987) is an American professional basketball player who last played for the Helsinki Seagulls of the Finnish Korisliiga. He signed with the team in June 2019.

References

External links
RheinStars Köln profile
German league profile
Eurobasket.com profile
San Diego State Aztecs bio

1987 births
Living people
American expatriate basketball people in the Czech Republic
American expatriate basketball people in Finland
American expatriate basketball people in Germany
American expatriate basketball people in Mexico
American men's basketball players
ABA All-Star Game players
Basketball players from San Diego
BK Pardubice players
Helsinki Seagulls players
Phoenix Hagen players
Point guards
PS Karlsruhe Lions players
San Diego State Aztecs men's basketball players
SC Rasta Vechta players
Skyliners Frankfurt players
Tijuana Zonkeys players
VfL Kirchheim Knights players